In January 2016, protests erupted in the Kasserine region of Tunisia over unemployment. These unemployment rates were 30% in the region as compared to the national 15.3%. In particular, there was high youth unemployment. The protests consisted of violence against the police and marching on Tunis. The incidents continued for a week injuring 59 officers and 40 protestors until the government imposed a curfew.

See also
 2021 Tunisian protests

References

2016 in Tunisia
2016 protests
Arab Winter in Tunisia
Protests in Tunisia
January 2016 events in Africa